Future Weather is a 2012 American drama film written and directed by Jenny Deller and starring Perla Haney-Jardine, Lili Taylor, Amy Madigan and Marin Ireland.

Cast
Perla Haney-Jardine as Lauduree
Lili Taylor as Ms. Markovi
Amy Madigan as Greta
Marin Ireland as Tanya
William Sadler as Ed
Anubhav Jain as Neel
Jenny Dare Paulin as Crystal
Michael Porter as Tommy

Reception
Roger Ebert awarded the film three and a half stars.

References

External links
 
 
 

American drama films
2010s English-language films
2010s American films